Francesco Cameli (25 May 1899 – 21 December 1957) was a sailor from Italy, who represented his country at the 1928 Summer Olympics in Amsterdam, Netherlands.

References 

 

Sailors at the 1928 Summer Olympics – 6 Metre
Olympic sailors of Italy
Italian male sailors (sport)
1899 births
1957 deaths